Jerry Gray (July 3, 1915 – August 10, 1976) was an American violinist, arranger, composer, and leader of swing dance orchestras (big bands) bearing his name. He is widely known for his work with popular music during the Swing era. He worked with the bandleaders Artie Shaw and Glenn Miller.

Early life
Jerry Gray was born Generoso Graziano in East Boston, Massachusetts, United States. His father, Albert Graziano, was a music teacher who began teaching his son violin at age seven.

Early career
In 1936, Gray joined Artie Shaw, who was calling himself Art Shaw, and his "New Music" orchestra as lead violinist. He studied musical arrangement under Shaw and became a staff arranger a year later. During the next two years he penned some of the band's most popular arrangements, including "Carioca", "Softly, As in a Morning Sunrise", "Any Old Time", and "Begin the Beguine."

In November 1939, Shaw suddenly broke up his band and moved to Mexico. The next day, Glenn Miller called Gray and offered him a job arranging for his band. It was initially a difficult move because Shaw had generally allowed his arrangers great musical latitude, while Miller's commercial orientation often led him to second-guess his staff. Gray gradually found himself more in line with Miller's less–mercurial personality and was allowed more of the freedom that he appreciated. As Gray later told author George T. Simon, "To me, Glenn's band didn't swing like Artie's. ... But after I made up my mind to accept things as they were, things started to click. ... He was a businessman who appreciated music. ... I may have been happier musically with Artie, but I was happier personally with Glenn."

Gray's time with the Glenn Miller Orchestra produced many of the most recognizable and memorable recordings of the era. He arranged "Elmer's Tune", "Moonlight Cocktail", "Perfidia", and "Chattanooga Choo-Choo" among others, while his compositions included "Sun Valley Jump", "The Man in the Moon", "Caribbean Clipper", "Pennsylvania 6-5000", "I Dreamt I Dwelt in Harlem", "Introduction to a Waltz" with Glenn Miller and Harold Dickinson, "Flagwaver", "Solid As a Stonewall Jackson" with Chummy MacGregor, "Oh So Good", "Jeep Jockey Jump", "Keep 'Em Flying", "Passage Interdit", "Snafu Jump", "A Love Song Hasn't Been Sung" with Bill Conway and Harold Dickinson, "Are You Rusty, Gate?", "Here We Go Again", and his most famous song, "A String of Pearls". 

Gray was again without a job when Glenn Miller broke up his band in September 1942 to enter the Army Air Forces. Captain Miller used his connections to have Gray posted in his unit; and in early 1943, Gray rejoined his old boss. Entrenched military bureaucracy halted Miller's initial plans to establish a group of service bands with Gray as coordinator of the arranging staffs. Instead, Gray became chief arranger for the Miller's "Band of the Training Command", which was later known as the Glenn Miller Army Air Forces Orchestra.

Gray was passed over for the job of leading the postwar "ghost" Glenn Miller Orchestra, reportedly because the Miller Estate felt he did not have the pop-star qualities they wanted in a new leader. In 1945, Grey was an arranger for the Tex Beneke-Glenn Miller Orchestra when Henry Mancini was the pianist. In 1947, Gray served as Mancini's best man at his wedding.

Listening to the Gray and Beneke orchestras provides an interesting contrast. Gray was arguably closer in spirit to the Miller legacy but never quite achieved the same level of popularity because he was less of a showman and Decca was no match for RCA's marketing machinery. Beneke benefited from greater name recognition and stage presence but was hampered by restrictions placed on him by the Miller Estate both before and after his split with RCA. Gray continued to tour with his band in various forms through the 1950s. In 1953 he and Henry Mancini worked on The Glenn Miller Story starring James Stewart and June Allyson. In addition to leading his dance band he wrote and arranged for singers such as Vic Damone.

Gray and his Orchestra performed at the twelfth Cavalcade of Jazz held at Wrigley Field in Los Angeles, which was produced by Leon Hefflin, Sr, on September 2, 1956.

Personal life
Jerry Gray married Barbara Ann Denby in 1951. They had a son, Albert Gray, named after Jerry Gray's father, who taught him how to play violin. Later, after a divorce, he married Joan Barton (1925–1977), a vocalist and film actress.

Filmography
 Tough Guys (1986)
 The Glenn Miller Story (1954)

References

Further reading
 Artie Shaw, Collected Papers, University of Arizona School of Music
 Glenn Miller and His Orchestra, George T. Simon, 1974
 Glenn Miller Army Air Force Band – liner notes, Ed Polic; BMG Music 2001

1915 births
1976 deaths
American male composers
American conductors (music)
American male conductors (music)
Swing bandleaders
Big band bandleaders
American music arrangers
American people of Italian descent
People from East Boston, Boston
20th-century American composers
Classical musicians from Massachusetts
20th-century American male musicians
Male jazz musicians
Glenn Miller Orchestra members